Anthony Spadaccini (born 1982) is a filmmaker from Delaware.

Biography

Anthony Edward Spadaccini was born April 14, 1982, in Wilmington, Delaware. His father Louis was a musician and lyricist, while his mother Melissa was a singer. Louis & Melissa released a Christian folk/pop album in 1986 entitled Read My Heart, when Anthony was only 4 years old.

Anthony's favorite hobby growing up was writing, acting, and recording fictitious radio shows and sitcoms on cassette. Once his younger sister Rebecca was old enough, she joined him. Anthony has credited Rebecca for helping fuel his creativity.

In high school, Anthony got his first video camera (a Zenith camcorder from the early 1980s) as a gift from his grandparents and began writing and directing several shorts and features. He considered filmmaking a hobby while working many entry-level customer service, telemarketing, and data entry jobs to support himself.

When his father Louis died February 5, 2004, of acute pancreatitis, he left behind several unfinished projects – including an unpublished manuscript and lyrics for a planned follow-up to Read My Heart. Anthony saw this as a sign that he should get serious about filmmaking.

Shortly thereafter, Anthony uploaded his short film The Troubled Interviewee to iFilm. Anthony had never publicly screened his work before and wanted to see if he was really any good at what he ultimately wanted to do with his life.

Film career

In 2004, Spadaccini founded Fleet Street Films, an independent film production company focusing on microcinema endeavors.

After The Troubled Interviewee was well received by viewers on iFilm in the summer of 2004, Spadaccini directed a trilogy (called The Film Truth Collection) of feature-length cinéma vérité pseudo-documentaries: Unstable, Aftermath, & Hatred, which have been recognized by critics and audiences alike as hard-edged underground exercises in realism. 

His short film Monday Morning (a tribute to the Chaplin/Keaton silent comedies) has played at numerous film festivals in the U.S. and Canada since 2005, and won 2nd place for Best Experimental Short at the 2006 Indie Gathering Film Festival. "The First Date", the follow-up to Monday Morning, won Best Experimental Short at the 2007 Indie Gathering Film Festival.

Spadaccini's critically acclaimed experimental short Emo Pill, distinguished for its beautiful & haunting imagery, has played at several festivals in the U.S. and Canada, debuting at the 2006 Newark Film Festival and winning 3rd Place for Best Experimental Short at the 2007 Indie Gathering Film Festival.

He also won Exemplary Filmmaking awards for both Emo Pill and Monday Morning at the 2006 Delaware Valley Film Festival.

Spadaccini's acting credits include Swedish dance/pop singer Bimbo Boy's Drama Queen music video, the sci-fi film The Rapture, and the horror short En Passant, all by award-winning filmmaker Johnny K. Wu. 

Spadaccini's horror pseudo-documentary, Head Case, premiered at the 3rd annual Newark Film Festival in 2007. The film drew in the largest crowd for a local independent film for the second consecutive year (following Emo Pill & Unstable's release in 2006). Head Case repeated this feat in 2008, when a director's cut of the film screened at the same festival.

Anthony has made special appearances on the local and regional media circuit and was a guest speaker for independent film production at Wilmington University in 2006.

In January 2008, Spadaccini began attending Academy of Art University in San Francisco, majoring in Motion Pictures & Television with a concentration in Producing.

In March 2009, Spadaccini made his music video directorial debut, which featured Chris Watson (a well-received contestant on the 7th season of American Idol) performing his song Still.

Following the underground success of Head Case, Spadaccini wrote & directed three follow-ups, The Ritual, Post-Mortem, and Head Cases: Serial Killers in the Delaware Valley. In 2010, he wrote & directed the music video for Bimbo Boy's song Je Suis Une Superstar (Empire Diamond Radio Remix).

In 2017, he started working on Viscera, the follow-up of Post-Mortem. The story is focused on Dylan Hayden, the sole survivor of his family tragedy, who is forced to face the truth about the events that changed his life a decade earlier. 
While working on the movie, he e-met the composer Alexandre Llanes, a French musician. He hired him to work on the movie score of Viscera. It ended up as a great friendship and after considering working on some projects together, they started working on a short film together (as co-director), When I See You (2019).

Filmography (2005-present)

 *Also produced

References and notes
[6] https://web.archive.org/web/20080512143943/http://theindiegathering.com/2006Winners.htm

[8] [10] https://web.archive.org/web/20080512144049/http://theindiegathering.com/07%20Winners.htm

References 

1982 births
American filmmakers
People from Wilmington, Delaware
Living people